Abdelkarim Fergat (born 2 March 1994) is an Algerian Greco-Roman wrestler. He is a four-time gold medalist in his event at the African Wrestling Championships. He also competed at the World Wrestling Championships both in 2018 and in 2019.

Career 

In 2020, he won one of the bronze medals in the men's 55 kg event at the Individual Wrestling World Cup held in Belgrade, Serbia. He qualified at the 2021 African & Oceania Wrestling Olympic Qualification Tournament to represent Algeria at the 2020 Summer Olympics in Tokyo, Japan. He competed in the men's 60 kg event where he lost his first match against Kenichiro Fumita of Japan. He also lost his next match in the repechage against Walihan Sailike of China. Both of his opponents went on to win a medal in the competition.

In 2022, he won one of the bronze medals in the 60 kg event at the Dan Kolov & Nikola Petrov Tournament held in Veliko Tarnovo, Bulgaria. He won the gold medal in his event at the 2022 African Wrestling Championships held in El Jadida, Morocco.

Achievements

References

External links 
 
 
 

1994 births
Living people
Algerian male sport wrestlers
African Wrestling Championships medalists
Olympic wrestlers of Algeria
Wrestlers at the 2020 Summer Olympics
21st-century Algerian people
Place of birth missing (living people)